Ruyschia is a genus of flowering plants belonging to the family Marcgraviaceae.

Its native range is from southern Mexico down to Tropical America. It is found in Belize, Bolivia, Colombia, Costa Rica, Ecuador, Guatemala, Honduras, the Leeward Islands, Mexico, Panamá, Peru, Trinidad-Tobago, Venezuela, Venezuelan Antilles and the Windward Islands.

The genus name of Ruyschia is in honour of Frederik Ruysch (1638–1731), a Dutch botanist and anatomist. He is known for developing techniques for preserving anatomical specimens, which he used to create dioramas or scenes incorporating human parts. 
It was first described and published in Enum. Syst. Pl. on page 2 in 1760.

Known species
According to Kew:
Ruyschia andina 
Ruyschia clusiifolia 
Ruyschia enervia 
Ruyschia moralesii 
Ruyschia pavonii 
Ruyschia phylladenia 
Ruyschia pilophora 
Ruyschia tremadena 
Ruyschia valerioi 
Ruyschia viridiflora

References

Marcgraviaceae
Ericales genera
Plants described in 1760
Flora of Veracruz
Flora of Southeastern Mexico
Flora of Central America
Flora of Venezuela
Flora of western South America